Adrian Hayes (22 May 1978 – 18 August 2014) was an English professional footballer who played in The Football League for Cambridge United as a midfielder, and later played for a number of non-league clubs, mostly in East Anglia and the South East.

He died in August 2014, aged 36, from a brain tumour.

References

External links

1978 births
2014 deaths
English footballers
Cambridge United F.C. players
Kettering Town F.C. players
Diss Town F.C. players
Boston United F.C. players
Tamworth F.C. players
King's Lynn F.C. players
Cambridge City F.C. players
Farnborough F.C. players
A.F.C. Sudbury players
Mildenhall Town F.C. players
Dereham Town F.C. players
Association football midfielders
Footballers from Norwich
English Football League players